This is a list of Category A listed buildings in Edinburgh, Scotland. This list contains all buildings outside the New Town and Old Town areas; those can be found at List of Category A listed buildings in the New Town, Edinburgh and List of Category A listed buildings in the Old Town, Edinburgh

In Scotland, the term listed building refers to a building or other structure officially designated as being of "special architectural or historic interest".  Category A structures are those considered to be "buildings of national or international importance, either architectural or historic, or fine little-altered examples of some particular period, style or building type." Listing was begun by a provision in the Town and Country Planning (Scotland) Act 1947, and the current legislative basis for listing is the Planning (Listed Buildings and Conservation Areas) (Scotland) Act 1997.  The authority for listing rests with Historic Scotland, an executive agency of the Scottish Government, which inherited this role from the Scottish Development Department in 1991. Once listed, severe restrictions are imposed on the modifications allowed to a building's structure or its fittings. Listed building consent must be obtained from local authorities prior to any alteration to such a structure. There are approximately 47,400 listed buildings in Scotland, of which around 8% (some 3,800) are Category A.

Edinburgh is centred on the medieval Old Town and the Georgian New Town. To the north is the historic port of Leith, on the shore of the Firth of Forth which is now built up from Cramond to Portobello. The modern city now extends south to the Pentland Hills. Edinburgh council area also includes a rural area to the west, containing several villages including South Queensferry, Kirkliston and Balerno.

There are over 4,500 listed buildings in Edinburgh, of which around 900 are listed at category A. This is many more than any in other council area in Scotland, represents almost 25% of all category A listings in the country and is more than any other city in the world. Buildings protected range from tiny St Margaret's Chapel, the oldest building in Edinburgh, to the Forth Road Bridge, Scotland's longest suspension bridge, opened in 1964.

Listed buildings 
For New Town buildings, see List of Category A listed buildings in the New Town, Edinburgh
 For Old Town buildings, see List of Category A listed buildings in the Old Town, Edinburgh

|}

Notes

References

External links

Edinburgh
Category A listed buildings